Too Many Kisses is a 1925 American silent comedy film directed by Paul Sloane that is based on the John Monk Saunders story "A Maker of Gestures."

Plot
Richard Gaylord Jr. is a modern Lothario who has so many sweethearts that his father does not know what to do with him. Tired of paying to get his son out of one romantic entanglement after another, Richard Gaylord Sr. sends his son to the Basque region of France, believing that the women there will only accept attentions from their own people.

Almost immediately, local girl Yvonne Hurja becomes infatuated with Richard, who she sees as being able to help her break free from the unwanted attention of local guardsman Julio. A rivalry grows between Richard and Julio.

Cast

Reception
A review in Billboard read, "This is an excellent selection for any exhibitor[...] Dix, as Richard Gaylord, is dashing and pleasing in every scene. His admirers especially will derive gratification from his work".

A Variety review noted: "Incidentally 'Harpo' Marx, of musical comedy fame (Marx Brothers), does a half-wit that makes him a screen possibility for comedies who will bear watching".

Legacy
This film is notable for being the earliest surviving film to feature Harpo Marx of the Marx Brothers. It is the only film in which he did not star alongside his brothers. (His youngest brother Zeppo starred in the similarly-titled A Kiss in the Dark, released only three months later). Harpo plays the Village Peter Pan, and technically has speaking lines (albeit not heard, since this is a silent film) for the first and last time in his career.

The film has been restored by the Film Preservation Society, its television premiere coming on Turner Classic Movies on November 29, 2020 before its release to Blu-ray the following day. Harpo's son Bill Marx composed and recorded a new soundtrack for this restoration.

See also
A Kiss in the Dark (1925 film)

References

External links

Movie Review by Mordaunt Hall, New York Times, March 3, 1925.

1925 films
1925 comedy films
1925 directorial debut films
American black-and-white films
American silent feature films
Silent American comedy films
Famous Players-Lasky films
Films directed by Paul Sloane
Films with screenplays by Gerald Duffy
1920s American films